Sybil Grove was an English actress. She was born Sybil Marian Westmacott on 4 October 1891 in Teddington, Middlesex, and was also known as Sybil Wingrove.

With reddish brown hair and standing 5'8", she trained at RADA and her stage debut was in 1927. She had seven years in the UK in straight plays, revues and musical comedies then seven years directing and playing in her own stock company in the Orient. She also worked in the United States. She died in 1957, aged 65, and was interred in Weston Super Mare Crematorium & Cemetery.

Selected filmography

 His Private Life (1928)
 A Bit of Heaven (1928)
 The Black Pearl (1928)
 Satan and the Woman (1928)
 Along Came Youth (1930)
 The Man from Blankley's (1930)
 Let Us Be Gay (1930)
 Sunshine Susie (1931)
 Hotel Splendide (1932)
 I'm an Explosive (1933)
 Red Wagon (1933)
 Maid Happy (1933)
 The Man from Toronto (1933)
 Too Many Millions (1934)
 Fighting Stock (1935)
 Luck of the Turf (1936)
 Tropical Trouble (1936)
 The Gay Adventure (1936)
 This Green Hell (1936)
 She Knew What She Wanted (1936)
 The Show Goes On (1937)
 Racing Romance (1937)
 Merry Comes to Town (1937)
 Why Pick on Me? (1937)
 What a Man! (1938)

References

External links

1891 births
Place of death unknown
Year of death unknown
People from Teddington
English film actresses
Actresses from London